Hans W. Schöchlin (6 March 1893 – 3 June 1978) was a Swiss rower. Together with his younger brother Karl he won eight medals in various events at the European championships of 1920 to 1931. The brothers also won the gold medal in the coxed pair event at the 1928 Summer Olympics. Later Hans took part in the 1936 Games, in the mixed literature event of the arts competition.

References

1893 births
1978 deaths
Olympic rowers of Switzerland
Rowers at the 1928 Summer Olympics
Olympic gold medalists for Switzerland
Olympic medalists in rowing
Swiss male rowers
Medalists at the 1928 Summer Olympics
European Rowing Championships medalists
Olympic competitors in art competitions